Richard Taylor Nash (born January 26, 1928) is an American jazz trombonist most associated with the swing and big band genres.

He was born in Boston, Massachusetts and began playing brass instruments at ten. He became more interested in this after his parents died, and he was sent to Kurn Hattin Homes for Children in Vermont. At Kurn Hattin Homes, the first instruments he studied were the trumpet and bugle. His first professional work came in 1947 with bands like that of Tex Beneke. He served in the California National Guard from 1950 to 1952 and played for a band.

After his discharge from the military, he went back to Boston, where he attended Berklee College of Music. He then joined Billy May's band. Later he became a first-call studio musician in Los Angeles, California. He was composer, conductor Henry Mancini's favorite trombonist, and was featured soloist on several Mancini soundtracks, beginning with Mr. Lucky and Peter Gunn. Nash's trombone is featured on the Theme From Hatari! from the soundtrack for the John Wayne film (1962), Breakfast at Tiffany's (1961), and Days of Wine and Roses. In 1959 he played bass trombone on Art Pepper + Eleven – Modern Jazz Classics.

His brother was the saxophonist Ted Nash and he has three children, Ted, also a saxophonist, Nikki, and Bill.

Discography
With Quincy Jones
Roots (A&M, 1977)
With Henry Mancini
The Music from Peter Gunn (1959)
The Music from Mr. Lucky (1960)
Combo! 1960
The Blues and the Beat 
Uniquely Mancini (1963)
Concert Sound of Henry Mancini (1964)
Latin Sound of Henry Mancini (1965)
Big Latin Band of Henry Mancini (1968)
Cop Show Themes (1976)
Lincoln Mayorga & Distinguished (1974)
Symphonic Soul
Theme from Z and Other Film Music
Theme Scene (1978)
Mancini Touch (1996)
Big Band Sounds (2000)
With Ted Nash
Peter Gunn (Crown, 1959)
With Pete Rugolo
Rugolo Plays Kenton (EmArcy, 1958)
10 Trombones Like 2 Pianos (Mercury, 1960)
The Original Music of Thriller (Time, 1961)

With Lalo Schifrin
Music from Mission: Impossible (Dot, 1967)
More Mission: Impossible (Paramount, 1968)
Mannix (Paramount, 1968)
Kelly's Heroes (soundtrack) (MGM, 1970)
Enter the Dragon (soundtrack) (Warner Bros., 1973)

With Erroll Garner
Close-Up in Swing (1961)
You Brought a New Kind of Love (1963)
 Night at the Movies Up in Erroll's (1999)

With Oscar Peterson
Bursting Out with the All-Star Big Band (1959)
Swinging Brass (1996)

With Louie Bellson
Louie Bellson's 7 (1976)
Live at Concord Summer Festival (1995)

With Tex Beneke
Dancers Delight (1996)
Music in the Miller Mood (2000)

With Esquivel!
Four Corners of the World (1958)
Other Worlds Other Sounds (1958)

With Anita O'Day
Jazz 'Round Midnight (1954)
Trav'lin' Light (1961)

With others
Harry James in Hi-Fi Harry James (1955)
Billy May Sessions, Nat King Cole (1951)
Finest Hour, Mel Tormé (2001)
Sonny's Dream (Birth of the New Cool), Sonny Criss (Prestige, 1968)
Chances Are It Swings, Shorty Rogers (RCA Victor, 1958)
Art Pepper + Eleven, Art Pepper (1959)
Jam Session at the Tower, Ray Anthony (1956)
Hair, Stan Kenton (Capitol, 1969)
Anything Goes (1990), Les Brown
Music from Other Galaxies, Don Ellis
South Rampart Street Parade, Pete Fountain (1963)
Jazz Me Blues, Jimmy Witherspoon (1998)
Tutti's Trombones, Tutti Camarata (1983)
Blues Cross Country, Peggy Lee (1961)
Percy Faith- The Beatles Album (gorgeous solos) 1970
Help Is on the Way, Melissa Manchester (1976)
16 Most Requested Songs, Teresa Brewer (1977)
Everything Must Change, Randy Crawford (1980)
1100 Bel Air Place, Julio Iglesias (1984)
In Good Company, Sue Raney (1990)
Showstoppers, Barry Manilow (1991)
Christmas Album, The Manhattan Transfer (1992)
Timepiece, Kenny Rogers (1994)
Hot Cha Cha, Don Swan
Latin Obsession, Larry Elgart
 Arabesque, Rudiger Gleisberg
 King of the Olympics, Paul Chihara
 Smile (Tribute to Hollywood), Julia Migenes
 Sonny's Dream (1968), Sonny Criss
Red Back Book/ Elite Syncopations, New England Conservatory (1992)
 'Fascinating' Rampal, Jean-Pierre Rampal (1994)
Big Band Latin Heat, The Palladium Orchestra (1998)
Brass Nation, Michael Davis (2000)

Soundtracks
Breakfast At Tiffany's  (1961)
Charade (1963)
Days of Wine and Roses  (1962)
Hatari!  (1962)  (featured soloist "Theme from Hatari!")
 The Bingo Long Traveling All-Stars & Motor Kings  (1976)
Roots   (1977)
King of the Olympics   (1988)
Sabrina   (1995)
Planet of the Apes   (2001)

Sources

External links
British Trombone Society Interview
All About Jazz
Dick Nash Interview - NAMM Oral History Library (2016)

1928 births
Living people
American jazz trombonists
American male jazz musicians
California National Guard personnel
Male trombonists
21st-century trombonists
21st-century American male musicians
United States Army soldiers